"When Something Stands for Nothing" is the debut single by Canadian rock band Headstones from their debut studio album, Picture of Health. The song peaked at No. 71 on Canada's RPM singles chart, and the single was certified platinum by the CRIA. It is considered to be one of the band's signature songs.

Track listing
 "When Something Stands for Nothing" (Album Version) - 3:37   
 "Three Angels" - 4:03   
 "Hindsight" - 3:58   
 "Won't Wait Again" - 2:57

References

External links

1993 songs
1993 debut singles
Headstones (band) songs
MCA Records singles